Ģibuļi parish is an administrative unit of Talsi Municipality, Latvia.

Towns, villages and settlements of Ģibuļi parish

References 

Parishes of Latvia
Talsi Municipality